North Okkalapa Township is located in the eastern part of Yangon. The township comprises 19 wards, and shares borders with Hlegu Township and Mingaladon township in the north, North Dagon Township in the east, Mingaladon Township and Mayangon Township in the west, and Kamayut Township, and Mayangon and South Okkalapa Townships in the south. North Okkalapa was one of the satellite towns established in 1959. Today, it is a firmly established part of the city, albeit with nominal access to the city's electricity grid and sewer system. It is located in the 5 to 30 minute drive zone to Yangon International Airport, the primary and busiest international airport of Myanmar, located in Mingaladon Township. For those who loves local trips, Aung Mingalar Highway Bus Station is located within 30 min drive zone from the township.

Education
The township has 30 government primary schools, seven middle schools and five high schools.

It is also homeland to one of the most selective universities in the nation: the University of Medicine 2, Yangon, and the University of Pharmacy, Yangon.

Free monastery Foreign Speaking Training Classes and paid ones can be found in the zone.

Also, Private soft skill training schools and computer training centers are located most of strategic locations in the township.

Health
The North Okkalapa General Hospital, an affiliated teaching hospital of the University of Medicine 2, is the major hospital for the township and vicinity.

Waibargi Hospital is well-known for providing medical treatments regarding infectious diseases.

Many private hospitals such as La Gabar, OSC and Shwe LaMin hospitals which are well-known for treatments and services are located in the township.

Moreover, there are so many private clinics can be found everywhere in the township.

Parks and gardens

Landmarks
The following is a list of landmarks in North Okkalapa township.

References

Townships of Yangon